Coma is a profound state of unconsciousness.

Coma may also refer to:

Arts and entertainment

Films and televisions
 Coma (1978 film), a 1978 film
 Coma (2009 film), a 2009 film
 Coma (2020 film), a 2020 science fiction film
 Coma (2022 film), a 2022 French film
 Coma (South Korean miniseries), a five-part South Korean miniseries
 "Coma" (The Brak Show), a 2003 episode

Music 
Coma (band), a Polish band
Coma (EP), a 1994 EP by Max Sharam
Coma, a 2018 album by Sunflower Dead

Songs 
"Coma" (Guns N' Roses song), a 1991 song by Guns N' Roses
"Coma" (Max Sharam song)", from the 1994 EP Coma and album A Million Year Girl
"Coma" (Pendulum song), a 1997 song by Pendulum
"Coma", a song from the 1991 album Horrorscope by Overkill
"Coma", a song from the 2001 album Shangri-La Dee Da by the Stone Temple Pilots
"Coma", a song from the 2002 album The End of the Beginning by God Is an Astronaut
"Coma", a song from 2005 album Enter the Chicken by Buckethead
"Coma", a song from the b-side of the 1999 single "Cave" by Muse

Other works
 Coma (novel), a 1977 novel by Robin Cook
 Coma (American miniseries), a 2012 miniseries based on the novel, by A&E
 The Coma, a 2004 novel by Alex Garland

Astronomy 
Coma (cometary), the diffuse portion of a comet
Coma (optics), the comatic aberration
Coma Cluster, located in the constellation Coma Berenices
Coma Star Cluster, in Coma Berenices
Coma Supercluster, in Coma Berenices
An abbreviation for the constellation Coma Berenices

Other uses 
Coma (fungi), a genus of fungi in the Phacidiaceae family
Coma (optics), an aberration out of lens design
Coma, Egypt, a village in Egypt in late antiquity
C.O.M.A., underground music festival in Montreal, Canada
Cache-only memory architecture for computers
Coma, also known as the saffron plum

People with the surname
Antonio Coma (1560–1629), Italian composer 
Franché Coma or Frank LiCata (born 1957), American musician
Joan Coma (1877–1959), president of FC Barcelona
Joel Font Coma (born 1966), Andorran politician
Julian Vila Coma, Andorran ambassador
Marc Coma (born 1976), Spanish motorcycle rider
Olga Adellach Coma (born 1966), Andorran politician
Patricia Coma, Filipino actress in the television drama First Yaya
Pere de Coma (fl. 13th century), architect

See also
Comas (disambiguation)
Comatose (disambiguation)
Comma (disambiguation)